Orbán Kolompár (born in Kiskunmajsa, People's Republic of Hungary, September 24, 1963) is a Hungarian Romani politician and activist, who served as President of the National Gypsy Council (OCÖ) from 2003 to 2011. He is the founder and chairman of the Romani Alliance Party (MCF).

Criminal charge
In 2012 Orbán Kolompár was sentenced to 22 months in prison under the charges of abuse of financial position and the violation of European Economic Community financial interests. His fugitive brother, László, was sentenced in absentia to 22 months in prison while his wife got a suspended prison term of a year under the same charges.

References

External links
 Biography 

1963 births
Living people
Hungarian politicians
Hungarian Romani people
People from Kiskunmajsa
Romani activists
Romani politicians